Burmeisteria is a genus of trilobites in the order Phacopida (family Homalonotidae) that existed during the lower Devonian in what is now South Africa. It was described by Salter in 1865, and the type species is Burmeisteria herschelii, which was originally described under the genus Homalonotus by Murchison in 1839. It also contains the species B. accraensis, B. acuminata, and B. noticus. The type locality was the Bokkeveld Group.

References

External links
 Burmeisteria at the Paleobiology Database

Devonian trilobites of Africa
Homalonotidae
Phacopida genera
Fossil taxa described in 1865